Ukraine is set to participate in the Eurovision Song Contest 2023 in Liverpool, United Kingdom, with "Heart of Steel" performed by Tvorchi. The Ukrainian national broadcaster, Public Broadcasting Company of Ukraine (UA:PBC), organised a national final in order to select the Ukrainian entry for the 2023 contest.

Background 

Following the introduction of semi-finals for 2004, Ukraine is the only country that has managed to qualify to the final in every contest they have participated in thus far.

The Ukrainian national broadcaster, Public Broadcasting Company of Ukraine (UA:PBC), broadcasts the event within Ukraine and organises the selection process for the nation's entry. In the past, UA:PBC had alternated between both internal selections and national finals in order to select the Ukrainian entry. Between 2016 and 2020, the broadcaster, in collaboration with commercial broadcaster STB, had set up national finals with several artists to choose both the song and performer to compete at Eurovision for Ukraine, with both the public and a panel of jury members involved in the selection. In 2022, the broadcaster opted to independently organise a national final to select the Ukrainian entry, a process that was used again for 2023. Production companies had the opportunity to submit their proposals from 9 to 30 September 2022, and the selected company, Starlight Media, was announced on 24 October 2022. The company previously produced the Ukrainian national finals between 2016 and 2020.

Following Ukraine's win in 2022, in accordance with Eurovision rules, the European Broadcasting Union (EBU) initially gave Ukraine the opportunity to organise the 2023 contest. However, the EBU later determined that Ukraine was not able to meet the demands of hosting the event due to security concerns caused by the Russian invasion of the country, and that discussions would begin with the BBC for potentially hosting in the United Kingdom, which came in second place in the 2022 contest. The United Kingdom was subsequently confirmed as the host country of the 2023 contest on 25 July, with UA:PBC working with the BBC to develop and implement Ukrainian elements for the live shows, and Ukraine being granted automatic qualification for the final.

Before Eurovision

Vidbir 2023 

The competition took place in the Maidan Nezalezhnosti metro station in Kyiv, and consisted of a final on 17 December 2022. The show was hosted by Timur Miroshnychenko, Kateryna Pavlenko and Zlata Ognevich, and broadcast on Suspilne Kultura, via radio on Radio Promin and online via UA:PBC's Eurovision Song Contest website eurovision.ua as well as Facebook and YouTube broadcasts. The competition was also streamed live on the Diia mobile application.

Format 
The selection of the competing entries for the national final and ultimately the Ukrainian Eurovision entry took place over three stages. In the first stage, artists and songwriters had the opportunity to apply for the competition through an online submission form. Thirty-six acts were selected and announced on to progress to the second stage, the longlist. The second stage involved the longlisted artists attending a scheduled audition during designated dates. Ten acts were selected and announced on 17 November 2022. The third stage was the final, which took place on 17 December 2022 and featured the ten acts vying to represent Ukraine in Liverpool. The winner was selected via the 50/50 combination of votes from a public vote conducted in the Diia mobile application and an expert jury, the members of which were chosen by the public. Both the public app voting and the expert jury assigned scores ranging from 1 (lowest) to 10 (highest) and the entry that had the highest number of points following the combination of these scores was declared the winner. Viewers participating in the public vote had the opportunity to submit a single vote via the Diia application. In the event of a tie, it would be decided in favour of the entry that received the highest score from the public.

The members of the expert jury for  2023 were selected via a public online vote in the Diia application. Nine candidates were presented to the public and a voting was open to all Ukrainian citizens from 31 October to 7 November 2022, with the three candidates topping the online voting being invited to become jurors of the show. The candidates were:

Jamala – winner of the Eurovision Song Contest 2016
 Kateryna Pavlenko – Ukrainian representative in the Eurovision Song Contest 2021 as part of Go_A, winner of Vidbir 2020
 Mykhailo Khoma – frontman and founder of Dzidzio
  – member of Antytila
 Tina Karol – Ukrainian representative in the Eurovision Song Contest 2006
  – actor and TV producer, frontman of Druha Rika
 Julia Sanina – member of The Hardkiss, runner-up of Vidbir 2016
 Zlata Ognevich – Ukrainian representative in the Eurovision Song Contest 2013
A total of 505,536 votes were received, and the top three of the voting were revealed to be: Taras Topolya (88,023 votes), Jamala (79,399 votes) and Julia Sanina (79,346 votes). The three were confirmed as jury members on 16 December 2022.

Competing entries 
Artists and composers had the opportunity to submit their entries via an online submission form which accepted entries between 17 August 2022 and 15 October 2022. Only artists that had not performed in events organized by/located in the territory of "the aggressor state" or illegally entered the territory of Crimea since 2014 were allowed to apply for the competition, and songs performed in the "language of the aggressor state" were prohibited. Musician Dmytro Shurov, who had been appointed the music producer of the competition, reviewed the 384 received submissions and longlisted 36 entries, of which their artists were announced on 27 October 2022. On 12 November 2022, Lue Bason withdrew from the longlist. Auditions were later held in Kyiv where ten entries were shortlisted to compete in the national final. The ten selected competing acts were announced on 17 November 2022, while the competing songs and the running order of the final were revealed on 1 December 2022.

Final 
The final took place on 17 December 2022. Ten entries competed and the winner, "Heart of Steel" by Tvorchi, was selected through the combination of votes from a public televote and an expert jury. Ties would be decided in favour of the entries that received higher scores from the televote. As an intermission while the voting window was open, an hour-long documentary titled , which details Kalush Orchestra's participation and victory in the Eurovision Song Contest 2022, was aired. In addition to the performances of the competing entries, jury member Jamala,  Verka Serduchka,  Zlata Dziunka and the competition's music producer Dmytro Shurov performed as guests.

Controversy

Krutь's appeal against Tvorchi 
Three days after the national final, UA:PBC revealed in a statement that runner-up Krutь appealed against winners Tvorchi regarding the musical accompaniment of the duo's performance, in which a double of the main vocal could be heard, which was against the rules of the national selection. The music producer of the national final, Dmytro Shurov, was given the task of assessing the broadcast recording of Tvorchi's performance, and stated that he "does not believe that such non-compliance of the record with the requirements of the rules is essential for evaluating the performance". Shurov also noted that the duplicated vocal could also be a technical error due to the difficult production conditions in an underground venue. A complaint was also made regarding the distribution of "Heart of Steel" by the label Believe Music, which still operates in Russia, but the organising committee concluded it was not a violation of the rules. After considering Krutь's appeal, the committee decided not to cease Tvorchi's participation.

At Eurovision 
According to Eurovision rules, all nations with the exceptions of the host country and the "Big Five" (France, Germany, Italy, Spain and the United Kingdom) are required to qualify from one of two semi-finals in order to compete in the final; the top ten countries from each semi-final progress to the final. In addition to its participation in the final, Ukraine was also required to broadcast and vote in one of the two semi-finals. This was decided via a draw held during the semi-final allocation draw on 31 January 2023, when it was announced that Ukraine would be voting in the second semi-final. On 13 March 2023, during the Heads of Delegation meeting, Ukraine was drawn to perform in position 19.

References 

2023
Countries in the Eurovision Song Contest 2023